John Walker Leach (July 22, 1888 – January 2, 1944) was a college football player.

University of Tennessee
He was a prominent, halfback, end and kicker for the Tennessee Volunteers of the University of Tennessee.  At Tennessee, he was a member of Sigma Alpha Epsilon. He was once appointed alumni member of the Tennessee Athletic Council. He was nominated though not selected for an Associated Press All-Time Southeast 1869-1919 era team.

1907
Leach played at end in 1907.

1908
Leach was captain of the school's 1908 team which was widely considered the best Tennessee football season up to that point. That year Vanderbilt coach Dan McGugin noted "All things considered, Leach was perhaps the best football player of the year in  Dixie." The team included College Football Hall of Fame guard Nathan Dougherty.

See also
1908 College Football All-Southern Team

References

1888 births
1944 deaths
Tennessee Volunteers football players
American football ends
American football halfbacks
All-Southern college football players
Players of American football from Virginia